Isabelle Demongeot and Nathalie Tauziat were the defending champions but lost in the quarterfinals to Lise Gregory and Gretchen Magers.

Elizabeth Smylie and Janine Tremelling won in the final 5–7, 6–3, 6–2 against Gregory and Magers.

Seeds
Champion seeds are indicated in bold text while text in italics indicates the round in which those seeds were eliminated. The top four seeded teams received byes into the second round.

Draw

Final

Top half

Bottom half

External links
 1989 Lufthansa Cup Doubles Draw

WTA German Open
1989 WTA Tour